Arsamaki is a rural locality (a village) in Posyolok Anopino, Gus-Khrustalny District, Vladimir Oblast, Russia. The population was 15 as of 2010.

Geography 
Arsamaki is located 18 km north of Gus-Khrustalny (the district's administrative centre) by road. Zhary is the nearest rural locality.

References 

Rural localities in Gus-Khrustalny District
Sudogodsky Uyezd